We Were Young is the debut solo album by Jonathan Jones, the singer and songwriter for the bands Waking Ashland and We Shot the Moon. The CD was first released to various websites and iTunes on February 3, 2009. Jones stated that physical copies of the CD will be available "this fall when [he] does a solo tour".

Track listing

 Simple Prayer*
 You Don't Need Me
 The Stills
 For Better Or Worse
 Passenger
 Pass Me By
 Autumn
 Like A Kid
 Advance and Retreat
 The Well
 Glass Windows
 Mister Paranoia
 My Favorite Color
 Settle Down
 Welcome Home

An asterisk (*) represents that the song also appears on the sampler for the We Shot the Moon album, A Silver Lining Sampler.

References

Jonathan Jones (musician) albums
2009 albums